The 13th Washington D.C. Area Film Critics Association Awards were announced on December 8, 2014.

Winners and nominees
Best Film
 Boyhood
 Birdman or (The Unexpected Virtue of Ignorance)
 Gone Girl
 Selma
 Whiplash

Best Director
 Richard Linklater – Boyhood
 Damien Chazelle – Whiplash
 Ava DuVernay – Selma
 David Fincher – Gone Girl
 Alejandro G. Iñárritu – Birdman or (The Unexpected Virtue of Ignorance)

Best Actor
 Michael Keaton – Birdman or (The Unexpected Virtue of Ignorance)
 Benedict Cumberbatch – The Imitation Game
 Oscar Isaac – A Most Violent Year
 David Oyelowo – Selma
 Eddie Redmayne – The Theory of Everything

Best Actress
 Julianne Moore – Still Alice
 Scarlett Johansson – Under the Skin
 Felicity Jones – The Theory of Everything
 Rosamund Pike – Gone Girl
 Reese Witherspoon – Wild

Best Supporting Actor
 J. K. Simmons – Whiplash
 Ethan Hawke – Boyhood
 Edward Norton – Birdman or (The Unexpected Virtue of Ignorance)
 Mark Ruffalo – Foxcatcher
 Andy Serkis – Dawn of the Planet of the Apes

Best Supporting Actress
 Patricia Arquette – Boyhood
 Jessica Chastain – A Most Violent Year
 Laura Dern – Wild
 Emma Stone – Birdman or (The Unexpected Virtue of Ignorance)
 Tilda Swinton – Snowpiercer

Best Adapted Screenplay
 Gone Girl – Gillian Flynn The Imitation Game – Graham Moore
 Inherent Vice – Paul Thomas Anderson
 The Theory of Everything – Anthony McCarten
 Wild – Nick HornbyBest Original Screenplay Birdman or (The Unexpected Virtue of Ignorance) – Alejandro G. Iñárritu, Nicolás Giacobone, Alexander Dinelaris Jr., and Armando Bo Boyhood – Richard Linklater
 The Grand Budapest Hotel – Wes Anderson
 The Lego Movie – Phil Lord and Christopher Miller
 Whiplash – Damien ChazelleBest Ensemble Birdman or (The Unexpected Virtue of Ignorance)
 Boyhood
 The Grand Budapest Hotel
 Into the Woods
 Selma

Best Animated Film
 The Lego Movie
 Big Hero 6
 The Book of Life
 The Boxtrolls
 How to Train Your Dragon 2
 Rio 2
 Mr. Peabody and Sherman

Best Documentary Film
 Life Itself
 Citizenfour
 Jodorowsky's Dune
 Last Days in Vietnam
 The Overnighters

Best Foreign Language Film
 Force Majeure • Sweden
 Ida • Poland
 Mommy • Canada
 Two Days, One Night • Belgium/France
 Wild Tales • Argentina

Best Art Direction
 The Grand Budapest Hotel
 Birdman or (The Unexpected Virtue of Ignorance)
 Interstellar
 Into the Woods
 Snowpiercer

Best Cinematography
 Birdman or (The Unexpected Virtue of Ignorance)
 The Grand Budapest Hotel
 Interstellar
 Unbroken
 Under the Skin

Best Editing
 Birdman or (The Unexpected Virtue of Ignorance)
 Boyhood
 Gone Girl
 Interstellar
 Whiplash

Best Score
 Under the Skin – Mica Levi Birdman or (The Unexpected Virtue of Ignorance) – Antonio Sánchez
 Gone Girl – Trent Reznor and Atticus Ross
 Interstellar – Hans Zimmer
 The Theory of Everything – Jóhann JóhannssonBest Youth Performance Ellar Coltrane – Boyhood
 Mackenzie Foy – Interstellar
 Jaeden Lieberher – St. Vincent
 Tony Revolori – The Grand Budapest Hotel
 Noah Wiseman – The Babadook

The Joe Barber Award for Best Portrayal of Washington, D.C.
 Captain America: The Winter Soldier
 Anita
 Kill the Messenger
 Selma
 X-Men: Days of Future Past

Multiple nominations and awards

These films had multiple nominations:

 11 nominations: Birdman or (The Unexpected Virtue of Ignorance)
 8 nominations: Boyhood
 6 nominations: Gone Girl
 5 nominations: The Grand Budapest Hotel, Interstellar, Selma, and Whiplash
 4 nominations: The Theory of Everything
 3 nominations: Under the Skin and Wild
 2 nominations: The Imitation Game, Into the Woods, The Lego Movie, A Most Violent Year, and Snowpiercer

The following films received multiple awards:

 5 wins: Birdman or (The Unexpected Virtue of Ignorance)
 4 wins: Boyhood

References

External links
 The Washington D.C. Area Film Critics Association

2014
2014 film awards
American film awards
Culture of Washington, D.C.
Mass media in Washington, D.C.